Wayne Township is one of seventeen townships in Kosciusko County, Indiana. As of the 2010 census, its population was 27,551 and it contained 11,267 housing units.

Wayne Township was organized in 1836.

Geography

Cities and towns
 Warsaw
 Winona Lake

Unincorporated towns
 Lakeside Park at 
(This list is based on USGS data and may include former settlements.)

Education
Wayne Township residents may obtain a free library card from the Warsaw Community Public Library in Warsaw.

References

External links
 Indiana Township Association
 United Township Association of Indiana

Townships in Kosciusko County, Indiana
Townships in Indiana